Ashford is a town in Surrey, England,  west of central London. Its name derives from a crossing point of the River Ash, a distributary of the River Colne. Historically part of Middlesex, the town has been part of Surrey since 1965. Ashford consists of relatively low density low- and medium-rise buildings, none of them being high rise. If excluding apartments (at the last census 27% of the housing stock) most houses are semi-detached.

Ashford railway station, on the Waterloo to Reading Line, is served by South Western Railway.

A leading gymnastics club, HMP Bronzefield and one of the sites of Brooklands College are in the town. Ashford Hospital, which began as a workhouse, is to the north of the town centre. Ashford Common has a parade of shops and is a more residential ward that includes part of Queen Mary Reservoir and all of its related water treatment works. The town is surrounded by some areas of green space including The Princes Club, Bedfont Lakes and Shortwood Common.

Topography

Ashford is in the almost flat alluvial plain formed by the historic courses of the River Thames on fairly fertile but gravelly soil in centuries past covered by deciduous forest for wood gathering, with clearings of meadow for pasture and to a lesser extent arable farming to supply the London market; sheep grazing continues today around the reservoirs. In common with western fringes of Greater London, gravel commences often within a metre of the surface which has led to 20th-century gravel extraction, which has formed the lakes to the north of the railway line. The extreme west is Shortwood Common, partly converted to a recreation ground, Ashford Park School, a cemetery.

North of this is the pair of Staines Reservoirs, the other green buffer is The Princes Club, Bedfont Lakes, spanning the northeast border; these areas constitute Metropolitan Green Belt buffers to the country's largest city. The area includes postally much of Queen Mary Reservoir (which covered most of the parish to the south of Littleton and almost none of historic Ashford) named after the wife of George V, Mary of Teck.

Most of the land is devoted to suburban and low-rise urban housing – as well as recreational areas, green belt in part of the Bedfont/Feltham fringe exists in the form of meadows used for walking, horse grazing and equestrianism around Feltham Young Offenders' Institution. A few parks such as the Ashford Reservoirs or Spelthorne Park are remnants of Ashford Common which give the eastern part of the town a reminder of its past status as a grazing common; these include recreation grounds such as Thames Water-sponsored Spelthorne Sports Club and the BP recreation ground.

In The Clumps, 37 houses in the Ashford post town, which has the postcode TW15, are in the London Borough of Hounslow, Greater London, alongside the Princes Club watersports lakes partly in Ashford post town but mostly in East Bedfont, Feltham post town, London. The other road with this status is the western half of Challenge Road, which has only business addresses.

History
Bronze Age artefacts have been found in Ashford (at 51.432708N, 0.485174W) giving rise to the name Bronzefield and a henge may have been present in that period. The settlement as indicated by its name but small assets just after the Norman Conquest was part agricultural settlement in Saxon times.

Ashford appears on the Middlesex Domesday map as Exeforde, held by Robert, Count of Mortain. Its Domesday assets were: 1 plough, meadow for 1 plough; a separate manor in 1066, it was part of the manor of Kempton in 1086. It rendered (in total) 14s 0d. Throughout the early medieval period the place was also referred to as Echelford.

A stone bridge was built over the ford in 1789 by the Hampton and Staines Turnpike Trust, part of which is used as the rather scenic Fordbridge roundabout with its large weeping willow trees at the centre.

Ashford Common was a large area of common land in the south and east of the town that the British Army used for military displays in the reign of George III. It was inclosed in 1809.

Ashford Manor Golf Club was established in 1902 at the property which was the Manor Farm House but the large manorial estate and manor house that were held by Solomon Abraham Hart from 1870 to 1882 had before 1902 been broken up among many small owners, and all trace of the manor house was lost.However the title of Lord of the Manor was acquired by Scott Freeman in 1890, and after passing to another partner of the solicitors Horne, Engall Freeman the title passed in more recent times to Russell Grant.

Ashford's housing stock is chiefly a mixture of detached and semi-detached housing built between 1885 and 1960.

Former schools
The Welsh School (later St David's School) was founded in 1857. Its building north of Ashford railway station is Gothic Revival, designed by Henry Clutton. St David's School is now defunct, but in 2010 its buildings and playing fields were the premises of St James Senior Boys School.

Ashford County Grammar School was founded in 1911. It became Ashford Sixth Form College in 1975 and Spelthorne College later. In 2007 it merged with Brooklands College. A property developer, Inland Homes plc, has since acquired the former grammar school buildings in Church Road. In 2017 it started to demolish the buildings without planning permission. The developer stopped the work at the request of Spelthorne Borough Council after demolition had started, but later continued the demolition, having received planning permission to build 357 new homes on the site.

Civic administration
In 1894, under the Local Government Act 1894, Ashford became part of the Staines Rural District of Middlesex. In 1930 the rural district was abolished and joined Staines Urban District. In 1965, under the London Government Act 1963, Middlesex County Council was abolished and the urban district was transferred to Surrey. In 1974, under the Local Government Act 1972, Staines Urban District was abolished and its area combined with that of Sunbury-on-Thames Urban District to create the present borough of Spelthorne.

Churches

The present Church of England parish church of St Matthew in Church Road was built in 1856–58 with financial help from the Welsh School. It was sited some yards west of Ashford's earlier parish church of St Michael, parts of which were Norman. St Michael's was demolished, but internal monuments and a 12th-century arch from it were incorporated into St Matthew's. William Butterfield designed St Matthew's in a Gothic Revival style. The tower was not completed until 1865.

St Hilda's parish church at the junction of Stanwell and Woodthorpe Roads was founded as a daughter church of St Matthew's to serve the rapidly expanding community around the railway station. Construction started in 1912 and most of the church was built in the first few years, but the chancel and some other parts were not completed until 1928. St Hilda's original design included a spire that would have been one of the most significant landmarks in the area, but it was never built. St Hilda's was initially a conventual district of St Matthew's parish, but is now a separate ecclesiastical parish. The easternmost parts of Ashford Common are in the parish of St Saviour's, Sunbury.

The Roman Catholic Church of St Michael in Fordbridge Road was begun in 1927 and the uncompleted building was consecrated in 1928. It was designed by Sir Giles Gilbert Scott in a Romanesque Revival style. Building continued in 1938, but the tower was not completed until 1960.

Ashford has two Methodist churches: one on Clarendon Road and the other in Ashford Common on Feltham hill Road.

There is a Congregational church in Clarendon Road.

The Salvation Army has a citadel in Woodthorpe Road.

Economy
The main street, Church Road, has local businesses, including Co-op, Tesco Express, Costa Coffee, Sainsbury's, several estate agents, three funeral directors, and several places to eat. Church Road is also home to the Ashford campus of Brooklands College (formerly Spelthorne College), Ashford Library and a prominent World War I memorial.

Ashford, in common with most of London suburbia, has very low unemployment rates. A great deal of local employment is directly related to Heathrow Airport. BP International is another major employer. Many other residents work in London or in the Thames Valley. Main dealers of Ford, Citroën and formerly Suzuki are along the town's outlying dual carriageway roads.

Transport

Railway
These two routes split after Staines. The third route forms the second main line run by the company, with quicker trains available from the next stations east and west. The station is referred to in timetables as either Ashford (Surrey) or Ashford (Middlesex), in order to avoid confusion with Ashford International station in Kent.

Roads
Not far north of the station is the A30 dual carriageway, which marks much of Ashford's northern border. It follows the old route from London to Devon and Cornwall. The alignment of this road is WSW–ENE.

A straight relief road, roughly WNW–ESE, was built by the Hampton and Staines Turnpike Trust. Now the A308, it has become a dual carriageway from Sunbury Cross to the junction with the A30 at Staines. This road marks some of the town's southern border. Ashford is close to the M25, M3 and A3 roads.

Buses
The town is on Hallmark Connections route 555 from Heathrow Airport to Walton-on-Thames, on three Transport for London routes, the 117, 216 and 290, also serving Isleworth, Kingston upon Thames and Twickenham respectively, and more occasional routes, including special school services run other operators.

Education

Primary schools
St Michael's Roman Catholic Primary School (4th best on benchmark of English and mathematics in the county)
Ashford Church of England Primary School
Echelford Primary School 
Spelthorne Junior School
Ashford Park Primary School
(above in order of best combined England and Maths benchmark score 2011 primary schools)
Ashford Infants School
Spelthorne Infant and Nursery School
Clarendon primary school and children centre

Secondary schools
Thomas Knyvett College
St James Senior Boys School, private and selective

In addition, three secondary schools were established in Sunbury-on-Thames, including the borough's religiously denominated senior schools, The Bishop Wand Church of England School and St Paul's Catholic College.

Further education
Ashford's further education college, Spelthorne College, became a Brooklands College Campus in 2007. It serves 16 to 18 year olds from a wide area of Surrey.

Sport

Active sports clubs in Ashford competitive at many levels are: Ashford Town F.C., Ashford Casuals F.C. and Ashford Cricket Club. Clubs exist for hockey, tennis, table Tennis, aikido, karate, golf and bowls, with leading clubs in acrobatic gymnastics and sailing which offer professional coaching from Olympic-level coaches.

Ashford Manor Golf Club is described above, a golf course that has 18 holes; one other is in the borough, Sunbury Golf Course in Charlton.  In 1921, the golf course was the site of the murder of British spy Vincent Fovargue by the IRA.

Spelthorne Atoms (previously known as Ashford Atoms) are one of the best youth basketball teams in the country having been to the national finals on a number of occasions.

Spelthorne Gymnastics club is one of the World's premier clubs for acrobatic gymnastics, having won eight World championship gold medals.

Watercourses
Ashford has one river, the River Ash, one of the six distributaries of the River Colne which runs in line with the Staines bypass under the Fordbridge roundabout at the far end of Fordbridge Road, its upper reach being the traditional border with Staines and then entering Laleham, passing close to the other side of the Queen Mary Reservoir.

The Staines Reservoirs Aqueduct (built 1902) flows from west to east across Ashford. It carries water from the Staines Reservoirs and King George VI Reservoir to Hampton water treatment works via Sunbury and Kempton Park.

Government
Ashford is part of the Spelthorne parliamentary constituency which has been represented by the Conservative Kwasi Kwarteng since 2010.

In Surrey County Council, 4 of the 81 councillors are elected by Ashford in whole or in part: Ashford is represented by a Conservative councillor, as is Staines South and Ashford West; Sunbury Common and Ashford Common is also represented by a Conservative councillor, and part of north Ashford is in the division of Stanwell and Stanwell Moor, represented by Robert Evans, a Labour Councillor.

Ashford has 12 representatives on Spelthorne Borough Council, headquartered in Staines-upon-Thames. The details below are for the 2011 election:

Demography and housing

The average level of accommodation in the region composed of detached houses was 28%, the average that was apartments was 22.6%.

The proportion of households in the settlement who owned their home outright compares to the regional average of 35.1%. The proportion who owned their home with a loan compares to the regional average of 32.5%. The remaining % is made up of rented dwellings (plus a negligible % of households living rent-free).

Notable people

 Sarah Ayton, Olympic gold medallist in the Yngling sailing class, 2004 and 2008
 Nicholas Bond-Owen, child actor in George and Mildred
 Anthony Burgess, novelist and Lord of Ashford, 1973–75
 Christopher Coleman, cricketer
 Bobby Davro, born Robert Nankeville, TV impressionist and actor
 Ray Dorset, singer-songwriter with Mungo Jerry
 Robert Evans, politician, Labour MEP 1994–2009
 Russell Grant, astrologer and stage actor, bought the title of Lord of the Manor of Ashford in 1996
 Roger Johnson, footballer
 James Lincoln, cricketer
 Scott Rendell, footballer currently playing for League Two team Wycombe Wanderers
Toby Roland-Jones, England cricketer
 Greg Searle, Gold medallist in the coxless fours in rowing, 1992 Summer Olympics, two other Olympic medals, 1993 Coxed Pairs world champion
 Spelbound, acrobatic group, 2010 Britain's Got Talent winners
 Anthony Watson, England rugby union player
 Sarah Webb, Olympic gold medallist in the Yngling sailing class, 2004 and 2008
 Norman Willis, General Secretary of the Trades Union Congress (TUC) 1984–92 and president of the European Trade Union Confederation 1991–93
 Ruth Wilson, Actress, Golden Globe winning actress for The Affair and two time Laurence Olivier Award winner.
 Phil Younghusband, footballer, all-time high scorer for the Philippines national football team

Notes and references

Notes

References

External links

 

 
Places formerly in Middlesex
Borough of Spelthorne
Towns in Surrey